Arlo is a 1968 live album by American folk singer Arlo Guthrie.

Track listing
All tracks composed by Arlo Guthrie; except where indicated

 "The Motorcycle Song" – 7:56
 "Wouldn't You Believe It" – 3:03
 "Try Me One More Time" (Ernest Tubb)– 2:13
 "John Looked Down" – 2:22
 "Meditation (Wave upon Wave)" – 6:38
 "Standing at the Threshold" – 2:34
 "The Pause of Mr. Claus" – 7:50

Personnel
Arlo Guthrie – vocals, guitar
Ed Shaughnessy – drums, tabla
Stan Free – piano, harpsichord
Bob Arkin – bass
Technical
Tory Brainard – recording engineer
Bill Szymczyk – mixing engineer
Henry Diltz – cover photography

References

Arlo Guthrie live albums
1968 live albums
Albums produced by Fred Hellerman
E1 Music live albums
Rising Son Records live albums
Albums recorded at the Bitter End